Henry J. Althoff (August 28, 1873 – July 3, 1947) was an American prelate of the Roman Catholic Church. He served as bishop of the Diocese of Belleville in Illinois from 1914 until his death in 1947.

Biography

Early life 
Henry Althoff was born on August 28, 1873, in Aviston, Illinois, to Frederick and Theresa (née Poelker) Althoff. He completed his classical and philosophy studies at St. Joseph College in Teutopolis, Illinois (A.B., 1898) and at St. Francis Solanus College in Quincy, Illinois (M.A., 1899). He then studied theology at the University of Innsbruck in Innsbruck, Austria,

Priesthood 
Althoff was ordained to the priesthood in Austria by then Bishop Simon Aichner on July 26, 1902. After returning to Illinois, Althoffe served as a curate at a parish in Damiansville, Illinois. In 1903, he was transferred to a parish in East St. Louis, Illinois. He served as pastor of parishes in Okawville, Illinois, and Nashville, Illinois, from 1905 to 1914.

Bishop of Belleville 
On December 4, 1913, Althoff was appointed as the second bishop of the Diocese of Belleville by Pope Pius X. He received his episcopal consecration on February 24, 1914, from Archbishop James Quigley, with Bishops Peter Muldoon and Paul Rhode serving as co-consecrators.Althoff was noted for his abilities with languages - he was fluent in German, French and Polish, and could maintain a conversation in Croatian, Italian and Lithuanian.

In July 1927. Atholl banned female parishioners from receiving communion if they were wearing makeup, sleeveless tops or low-cut tops. In 1937, Althoff forbade church-sponsored gambling in the diocese, encouraging Catholics to support their parishes by direct contribution rather than parish parties and festivals. Later that year, he banned dancing the night before a holy day.  Since New Years Day was a holy day, that meant no parties on New Years Eve. Atholl was named by the Vatican as an assistant at the pontifical throne on April 15, 1939.

Henry Althoff died after a three-month illness in Belleville on July 3, 1947, at age 73. Althoff Catholic High School in Belleville is named in his honor.

References

Episcopal succession

1873 births
1947 deaths
Quincy University alumni
University of Innsbruck alumni
People from Clinton County, Illinois
20th-century Roman Catholic bishops in the United States
Roman Catholic bishops of Belleville
People from Washington County, Illinois